Yio Chu Kang Stadium is a multi-purpose stadium located in Ang Mo Kio, Singapore.

It has a seating capacity of 2,000.

It is run by Sport Singapore and was opened to the public on 1 April 1985. It is a rugby specific stadium with 8-lane running track.

History
In December 2015, Hong Kong played against Singapore during the 2015 U-19 Asia Rugby Championship held at the stadium. The Singapore side lost the game 10-61.

On 7 December 2019, the Special Olympics South-east Asia Unified 5-a-side Football Tournament kicked off in Singapore at the stadium seven years after its inauguration.

Transport
The stadium is accessible by MRT, bus and taxi and it is a short walk from Yio Chu Kang MRT station.

References

See also
List of stadiums in Singapore

Football venues in Singapore
Rugby union stadiums in Singapore
Buildings and structures in Ang Mo Kio
Multi-purpose stadiums in Singapore
1985 establishments in Singapore